Carleton Clarke (28 August 1875 – 13 December 1961) was a Barbadian cricketer. He played in two first-class matches for the Barbados cricket team in 1893/94.

See also
 List of Barbadian representative cricketers

References

External links
 

1875 births
1961 deaths
Barbadian cricketers
Barbados cricketers
People from Saint Michael, Barbados